San Luis Río Colorado Airport  is an airport located  at San Luis Río Colorado, a city in the state of Sonora in Mexico. The city is near the U.S.-Mexico border, on the opposite side of San Luis, Arizona. The airport is used solely for general aviation purposes.

Facilities

References

External links
 MM76 at Fallingrain.
 MM76 at Elite Jets.
 MM76 pic at Our Airports.

Airports in Sonora
San Luis Río Colorado Municipality, Sonora